Álvaro Núñez may refer to:

 Álvaro Núñez de Lara (died 1218), Castilian nobleman and knight
 Álvaro Núñez de Lara (died 1287), Castilian nobleman
 Álvaro Núñez (footballer) (born 1973), Uruguayan footballer

See also
 Álvar Núñez Cabeza de Vaca (1488-1560?), Spanish explorer